One of the key factors in cricket bowling is the grip. Variation in grip has a major influence on the outcome of a delivery. Below is the grip for an inswing delivery.  
To produce the grip for an outswinging delivery, you simply have place your fingers on the other side of the seam. For a right hander you would slightly angle the seam so that it is faced towards first slip. 

For a pace bowler there are many variations of grip that can be adopted to produce different results. A cross-seam delivery for example is one that is used commonly in all formats of the game. when bowled a cross-seam delivery can either land on the smooth leather side of the ball and skid on possibly keeping low or zipping off the pitch. It could also land in the seam making the ball bounce up sharply and unexpectedly surprising the batsman. Overall this is a very useful grip to use, once mastered it has a place in any fast bowler's arsenal.

See Delivery (cricket) for a description of different types of delivery and their associated grip.

See also
Bowling action
Cricket terminology

Cricket captaincy and tactics
Cricket terminology
Bowling (cricket)